Anne Hull (born June 8, 1961) is an American journalist. She was a national reporter at The Washington Post for nearly two decades. In 2008, the Post was awarded the Pulitzer Prize for Public Service, citing the work of Hull, reporter Dana Priest and photographer Michel du Cille for "exposing mistreatment of wounded veterans at Walter Reed Hospital, evoking a national outcry and producing reforms by federal officials".

Hull has written for The New Yorker, the Washington Post Magazine and River Teeth. She is the author of Through the Groves, a memoir about growing up in the orange groves of central Florida (Henry Holt & Company, June 2023).

Career

Hull started as a feature writer at St. Petersburg Times (now Tampa Bay Times) in 1986 after working as a clerk in the Times newsroom. She spent months following a special police unit assigned to patrol a low-income area in Tampa. The story was told in a three-part series called "Metal to Bone" and received the American Society of Newspaper Editors Non-Deadline Writing Award in 1995.  In 1999, Hull followed a group of women from central Mexico to work in a North Carolina crab processing facility. The series, "Una Vida Mejor," was a 2000 Pulitzer Prize finalist in national reporting  and feature writing.

In 2000, Hull joined theWashington Post. She was an enterprise reporter on the Post's national staff from 2000-2017. She wrote about low-wage workers, rural voters, immigration in the American South, LGBT teenagers coming out in the Bible Belt and Newark, Hurricane Katrina and soldiers back from the war in Iraq. In 2008, she received the Elijah Parish Lovejoy Award for Courage in Journalism for "her closely observed narratives of people living on the margins of society in America".

Walter Reed Scandal

In late 2007, Hull and fellow Post reporter Dana Priest and photographer Michel du Cille went behind the gates at Walter Reed Army Medical Center in Washington to investigate the living conditions of wounded soldiers from the wars in Iraq and Afghanistan. They found mold, rats and the neglect of outpatient soldiers who were stuck in bureaucratic limbo on the grounds of Walter Reed. The stories sparked outrage, resulting in the resignation of Secretary of the Army, Francis J. Harvey. Congressional investigations were led by Rep. Henry Waxman (D-CA), who chaired the United States House Committee on Oversight and Government Reform in the House and by Sen. Carl Levin (D-MI), on the Senate side, who chaired the United States Senate Committee on Armed Services. Republicans and Democrats joined hands in criticizing the respective parties responsible for the conditions there.

This prompted President George W. Bush to appoint former Senate Majority Leader and 1996 presidential candidate Sen. Bob Dole (R-KS) and former U.S Secretary of Health and Human Services Donna Shalala to oversee the process of healthcare for wounded soldiers.

The Post was awarded the 2008 Pulitzer Prize for Public Service for uncovering the problems at Walter Reed.

Awards

Hull is a recipient of the Robert F. Kennedy Journalism Award, the Investigative Reporters and Editors Medal, the Worth Bingham Prize for Investigative Journalism, and the ASNE Distinguished Writing Award. She has been a Pulitzer Prize finalist several times.

Other

Hull was a Nieman Fellow at Harvard (Class of '95). She has been a Holtzbrinck Fellow at the American Academy in Berlin (2010) and a visiting Ferris Professor of Journalism at Princeton University (2011). She served on the Board of Trustees of the Poynter Institute For Media Studies in St. Petersburg. She lives in Washington, D.C.

References

External links
 The Invisible Reporter: Q&A with Anne Hull, Poynter
 Anne Hull Bio, Nieman Narrative Digest
 Articles at washingtonpost.com, The Washington Post
 Soldiers Face Neglect, Frustration at Army's Top Medical Facility, The Washington Post, February 18, 2007
  In the Bible Belt, Acceptance is Hard Won, The Washington Post, September 26, 2004
 Una Vida Mejor, A Better Life, The St. Petersburg Times, May 10, 1999
 Rim Of the New World, The Washington Post
 Reporters Who Broke Story on Conditions at Walter Reed, All Things Considered, NPR, March 6, 2007
 The Strawberry Girls, The New Yorker, August 11, 2008

American women journalists
The Washington Post people
Nieman Fellows
Elijah Parish Lovejoy Award recipients
Florida State University alumni
Living people
1961 births
21st-century American women